The Molson's Canadian Open was a golf tournament on the LPGA Tour, played only in 1969. It was played at the Shaughnessy Golf & Country Club in Vancouver, British Columbia, Canada. Carol Mann won the event by three strokes over Sandra Post and Kathy Whitworth.

References

Former LPGA Tour events
Women's golf tournaments in Canada
Sport in Vancouver
1969 in British Columbia
Women in British Columbia